Walnut Ridge Friends Meetinghouse is a historic Quaker meeting house located in Ripley Township, Rush County, Indiana.  It was built in 1866, and is a one-story, vernacular Italianate style brick building with a moderately pitched gable roof. It features a projecting octagonal entrance bay added in 1890 at the time of an extensive renovation.  The building was remodeled in 1972 and a fellowship room addition constructed in 1976. The Walnut Ridge Meeting was established in 1827.

It was listed on the National Register of Historic Places in 1984.

References

Quaker meeting houses in Indiana
1827 establishments in Indiana
Churches on the National Register of Historic Places in Indiana
Italianate architecture in Indiana
Churches completed in 1866
Buildings and structures in Rush County, Indiana
National Register of Historic Places in Rush County, Indiana